The IHF Badge of Merit is awarded by International Handball Federation to individuals who made an extraordinary contribution to the development of handball.

Levels
The Badge of Merit is awarded at three levels: Bronze, Silver and Gold.

IHF Gold Badge of Merit
The Badge of Merit in Gold is awarded to individuals who have made an outstanding contribution and/or given many years’ service to the sport of handball within the IHF. It therefore recognises, in particular, many years’ successful work within an IHF organ and/or a creative impetus for the development of handball.

The Badge of Merit consists of the Council’s insignia with half garland in gold. It is awarded by the IHF Council at the recommendation of the IHF Executive Committee, of the continental federations or of the member federations.

Recipients of IHF Gold Badge of Merit

IHF Silver Badge of Merit
The Badge of Merit in Silver is awarded to individuals who have worked with merit for many years within the sport of handball and/or have made
a particular contribution to the organisation of IHF competitions.

The Badge of Merit consists of the Council’s insignia with half garland in silver. It is awarded by the Council at the recommendation of the
continental federations, of the member federations, of the IHF Commissions or of the Head Office.

Recipients of IHF Silver Badge of Merit

IHF Bronze Badge of Merit
The Badge of Merit in Bronze is awarded to individuals who made an extraordinary contribution to the development of handball within their national and/or continental federation.

The Badge of Merit consists of the Council’s insignia with a half garland in bronze. It is awarded by the continental federations at the request of their committee or the member federations. Every year, the IHF Council establishes a quota for such awards. The final date for the submission by the continental federations of their list of awards to the Head Office is 30 October of each year. This list is also sent to the Council for information.

External links
 IHF Statuts Chapter XXI - Regulations of Awards

International Handball Federation awards
Awards established in 1974